Neptune, also known as Sun Multithreaded 10 GbE, is a dual 10 Gbit/s, multithreaded, PCIe x8-based network interface controller for 10 Gigabit Ethernet. It was developed and originally produced by Sun Microsystems, and later licensed to Marvell Technology Group in 2007.

A Neptune-based NIC is integrated in UltraSPARC T2 CPUs (Network Interface Unit, or NIU).

NIC Features

References

External links
Sun's Neptune Specs

Networking hardware
Sun Microsystems hardware